Southampton Football Club is an English association football club based in Southampton, Hampshire. Founded in 1885 as St Mary's YMA, they became a professional club in 1891 and co-founded the Southern Football League in 1894. Southampton won the Southern League Premier Division championship six times between 1896 and 1904, and were later elected to the Football League Third Division in 1920. The Saints finished as runners-up in their first Football League season, and the following year received promotion to the Second Division as Third Division South champions. The club first entered the First Division in 1966, and currently play in its modern-day counterpart, the Premier League. Southampton won the FA Cup in 1976, reached the final of the League Cup in 1979 and 2017, and won the League Trophy in 2010.

Since the club's formation, a total of 219 players have made 100 or more appearances for Southampton. Winger Terry Paine holds the record for the highest number of appearances for the Saints, having played 816 times for the club between 1957 and 1974. As of 2008, nine other players have made more than 400 appearances for Southampton. The club's top goalscorer is Mick Channon, who scored 228 goals in all competitions in two spells with the club, between 1966 and 1977, and from 1979 to 1982. Matt Le Tissier is the only player to have won the Southampton F.C. Player of the Season award three times, while five other players (Peter Shilton, Tim Flowers, James Beattie, Rickie Lambert and José Fonte) have received the accolade twice. Le Tissier is also the only player besides Channon to have scored over 200 goals for Southampton.

Key
The list is ordered first by date of debut, and then if necessary in alphabetical order by surname.
Appearances as a substitute are included. This feature of the game was introduced in the Football League at the start of the 1965–66 season.
Statistics are correct up to and including the match played on 18 March 2023. Where a player left the club permanently after this date, his statistics are updated to his date of leaving.

Players

Footnotes

References

External links
Southampton F.C. official website
Saints Players Archive

Southampton F.C.
Southampton-related lists
Association football player non-biographical articles